Sedgwick station is a SEPTA Regional Rail station at 253 East Mount Pleasant Avenue between Sprague and Devon Streets in Philadelphia, Pennsylvania. The old station building was built in 1882 with Furness & Evans as the architect, according to the Philadelphia Architects and Buildings project but was damaged in an arson fire around 1980 and demolished. The current station facility consists of low level platforms with open shelters. A walkway under the tracks was sealed off due to criminal activity.

The station is in zone 2 on the Chestnut Hill East Line, on former Reading Railroad tracks, and is 8.9 track miles from Suburban Station. In 2013, this station saw 225 boardings and 279 alightings on an average weekday.

Station layout

References

External links
 SEPTA - Sedgwick Station
 Mount Pleasant Avenue entrance from Google Maps Street View

SEPTA Regional Rail stations
Frank Furness buildings